The VL-1 was the first instrument of Casio's VL-Tone product line, and is sometimes referred to as the VL-Tone. It combined a calculator, a monophonic synthesizer, and sequencer. Released in June 1979, it was the first commercial digital synthesizer, selling for $69.95.

It has 29 calculator-button keys (G to B), a three-position octave switch, one programmable and five preset sounds, ten built-in rhythm patterns, an eight-character LCD, a 100-note sequencer, and a multi-function calculator mode. The VL-1 is notable for its kitsch value among electronic musicians, due to its cheap construction and its unrealistic, uniquely low-fidelity sounds.

The VL-1 was followed by the VL-10, a very similar machine in a smaller unit, and the VL-5, a polyphonic version, capable of playing four notes simultaneously, but lacking the VL-1's synthesizer section due to the removal of the calculator mode.

RadioShack sold a rebranded version of the VL-1 called the Realistic Concertmate 200.

Sound
Its sounds were mostly composed of filtered squarewaves with varied pulse-widths. Its piano, violin, flute and guitar timbres were nearly unrecognizable abstractions of real instruments. It also featured a "fantasy" voice, and a programmable synthesizer which provided for choice of both oscillator waveform and ADSR envelope. It had a range of two and a half octaves.

Features

The VL-1 featured a small LCD display capable of displaying 8 characters. This was primarily used for the calculator function, but also displayed notes played. The VL-1 also had changeable tone and balance, basic tempo settings and a real-time monophonic music sequencer, which could play back up to 99 notes. There were also 10 pre-loaded rhythms which utilized just three basic drum sounds. Casio internally named these sounds "Po" (30ms), "Pi" (20ms) and "Sha" (160ms).

Voices
Piano,  Fantasy, Violin, Flute, Guitar, Guitar(II), English Horn, and Electro sound (I, II and III) are available in ADSR Mode. Piano, Fantasy, Violin, Flute and Guitar (I) have direct access, and Guitar (II), English Horn, Electro sound (I, II and III) only can be used with ADSR button.

The sounds (*) do not have direct access through a button, but they are part of the ADSR variables, so there are 5 more sounds in reality, although they can only be used through the synthesizer and must be entered through a code. So it would look like this: Piano, Fantasy, Violin, Flute, Guitar (I) are available at the same time, and any of the mentioned sounds or Guitar (II), English Horn, Electronic sound (I), (II) and ( III) can only be obtained by means of a code and occupy one at a time on the ADSR button.

ADSR 
The VL-1 was programmed by entering a number into the calculator section's memory, then switching back to keyboard mode.

It worked like this (the number is the value for each):

Example (90099914)
 9 Waveform
 0 Attack
 0 Decay
 9 Sustain level
 9 Sustain time
 9 Release time
 1 Vibrato
 4 Tremolo

Notable uses and appearances

 Spanish pop group Mecano used a Vl-tone for their second hit single "Perdido en mi habitación" in 1981 in the videoclip of musical program "Aplauso" on TVE (TeleVisión Española) (Spanish TeleVision)

 The VL-1 acquired enduring notability in 1982, when the German band Trio used it in one of their songs, the "faux-Kraftwerk tune", "Da Da Da". They used the Rock-1 rhythm preset and the Piano voice.
 A similar rhythm preset, Rock-2, features in the first half of "The Man Whose Head Expanded" by The Fall, only to be cut short by Mark E. Smith's command to "turn that bloody blimey space invader off". The Rock-1 preset was also used in the groups track "Fortress" on their album Hex Enduction Hour.
 Industrial artist Monte Cazazza uses the VL-1's drum patterns on both sides of the "Stairway to Hell"/"Sex Is No Emergency" single (1982).
 The music video for Thomas Dolby's hit "She Blinded Me With Science" shows a group of schoolchildren holding VL-1s during a dream sequence.
 The Human League used the VL-1 for "Get Carter", a song on their album Dare.
 "Le Casio", the final track on the album Vehicles and Animals by Athlete uses the VL-1's 'Fantasy' voice.
 The VL-1 is used by death industrial act Brighter Death Now.
 The Rock-1 and Rock-2 rhythms are heard on the track "Stop/Start" by The Assembly.
 A VL-1 is used in "A Lap Dance Is So Much Better When The Stripper Is Crying" by Bloodhound Gang.
 In 1995, "parsimonious" French singer/songwriter Dominique A used a minimum of instruments, including the VL-1 (called the "VL Tone" in the French press).
 The progressive electronica band Yip-Yip often uses the VL-1's distinctive beats.
 Fergie's "Clumsy" also uses the 'Rock-2' beat from the VL-1.
 On older Sakata (Australian rice cracker company) advertisements, the Rock-1 rhythm is used as a backing beat.
 In one Homestar Runner cartoon, Strong Bad creates a "crazy cartoon" called "Sweet Cuppin' Cakes", in which he appears as a character, but with a VL-1 as a head. When he gets angry, he plays the VL-1's Demo Song.
 The Rock-2 rhythm is used in the track "Who Was That" by Deee-Lite.
 2-D, from the band Gorillaz, says that his first keyboard was a Custom VL-1.
 Canadian musician and sound designer David Kristian's The Mariana Trench album was made entirely using a VL-1 through various guitar effect pedals and loopers.
 In Ecuador, the demo song of the VL-1 is played in a news program that broadcast on Radio Cristal Guayaquil called "Desayúnese con las noticias"; the song is played daily at 7:30AM.
 British bubblegum-pop duo Mogul used the VL-Tone extensively throughout their early recordings, including a female vocal-led version of "Roll With It".
 A VL-1 rhythm appears towards the end of the Trans-X song "Living on Video".
 In 2009, Cobol Pongide toy music artist used Vl-1 on the album Musica per Anziani Cosmonauti in ADSR synthesizer mode.
 Luke Haines' 2011 album 9½ Psychedelic Meditations on British Wrestling of the 1970s and early '80s includes the track "Big Daddy Got A Casio VL-Tone", which features the Casio's distinctive beats.
 Tony Banks used VL-Tone's Rock 1 rhythm as the basis for his song "Charm" from the album The Fugitive (1983). The song was also released as a single.
 Croatian pop group Magazin used the VL-1 on their album "Kokolo", released in 1983.
 XTC's Andy Partridge used the VL-1's sequencer in conjunction with the Violin sound to produce the fast Middle-Eastern runs on his demo to "Terrorism" (1985) which can be found on Coat of Many Cupboards and (originally) The Meeting Place EP.
 "Casio Song", the opening track on the Dzeltenie Pastnieki album Depresīvā pilsēta (1986), is the Casio VL-1 demo song with lyrics written and sung over it by Roberts Gobziņš. The instrument is heard on many more of their studio recordings, and has most recently appeared live in 2012, being played by Viesturs Slava on the song "Mēness deja".
 "Fantasy Shift" from Stephen Molyneux's The Stars Are the Light Show (2012, Watery Starve Press) features the VL-1 "Fantasy" voice.
 "Government Hooker" by Lady Gaga, featured on the album Born This Way, features the Piano voice.
 Richard Barone has used the Casio VL-1 on many albums he has produced since the 1980s, especially augmenting real strings with the violin setting, and augmenting Mellotron sounds with the VL-1 flute sound.
 Jimmy Fallon has used the Casio VL-1 (Tone) on covers using classroom instruments with The Roots and Buckwheat Zydeco. Recording artists including Carly Rae Jepsen, Mariah Carey, Idina Menzel, Robin Thicke, The Lonely Island.
 "Far Too Young to Die" from 2013 album Too Weird to Live, Too Rare to Die! by Panic! at the Disco features VL-1 beats throughout the song.
 The Casio VL-1 features throughout the track 'Rudebox' by Robbie Williams.
 In 1997, the One Hit Wonder 'Your Woman' by White Town uses a VL-1 during the bridge of the song.
 The UK chart-topper "Boom, Boom, Boom, Boom!!" by Dutch group Vengaboys briefly features the VL-1 preset drum rhythm.
 Bully by Rockstar uses the VL-1 preset drum rhythm for the song "Vendetta Nerds", composed by Shawn Lee.
 The rock band Have A Nice Life used the Rock 1 drum beat of the Casio VL-1 for their song, "Holy Fucking Shit: 40,000" off their debut album, Deathconsciousness.
 "Droopy likes your face" by C418 used the Rock 1 drum beat of the Casio VL-1 from Life Changes Moments Seem Minor in Pictures and Minecraft - Volume Alpha.
 Cassette culture artist Barry Lamb recorded an entire album "Picnic" using only the Casio VL-1. It was released on Falling A Records in 1981. 
 "Letter to The Editor" by Thievery Corporation features 'Rock-2' beat from the VL-1.
The 'Rock-2' rhythm is used in the song "Toneflow" by Polaroids of the Pyramids.
The Dungeon Synth artist Blood Lord uses a Casio VL-Tone.
"It Is Real" by The Dangerous Summer uses the Vl-1 throughout the entire song
 The instrument appears in the songs Kamchatka(Камчатка - https://www.youtube.com/watch?v=tkn95UBUvnQ ), Tranqvilizator (Tranquiliser), and a version of The last Hero (Posledny Geroi), all by the Soviet band Kino (Кино).

 Work That by Megadog’s DJ Evolutions alter ego, Fraud Star from England on Miami tech house label, Teknology.

See also
 Casiotone

References

External links
 A vst emulator of the VL-1 for PC
 User-made recreation of the Casio VL-1 manual

VL-1
Casio musical instruments
Digital synthesizers
Monophonic synthesizers
Products introduced in 1979